Chesterfield Square is a 0.63-square-mile neighborhood in Los Angeles, California, located within the South Los Angeles region. It contains its namesake park, along with the Van Ness Recreation Center.

History
The neighborhood is a mix of low-density commercial, industrial, and residential development with characteristic bungalow houses. Chesterfield Square was once known as the site of the worst incident of gang violence in L.A. history, in which 5 people were left dead in a gang-related mass murder called the "54th St. Massacre" in 1984. The neighborhood has since bounced back through redevelopment.

Geography

The Chesterfield Square neighborhood touches Vermont Square on the north, Harvard Park on the east, Manchester Square on the south, and Hyde Park on the west. It is bounded by West 54th Street on the north, Western Avenue on the east, Florence Avenue on the south and South Van Ness Boulevard on the west.

It is notable within the city for the relatively low  percentage of its 6,000+ residents born outside the United States, for being in first place for the number of violent crimes committed of areas of Los Angeles and for the fact that the percentage of veterans who served during World War II and the Korean War is among the county's highest.

Population

A total of 6,062 people lived in Chesterfield Square's 0.63 square miles, according to the 2000 U.S. census—averaging 9,571 people per square mile, about the average population density for both the city and the county.

The median age was 31, about average for the city and the county, but the percentages of residents aged 10 or younger or 11 to 18 were among the county's highest. There were 406 families headed by single parents; the rate of 29.8% was the fourth-highest among city neighborhoods.

Within the neighborhood, African Americans made up 58.6% of the population—considered a high percentage for the county—while  Latinos were 36.9%. Other ethnicities were White, 1.5%; Asian, 0.8%; and other, 2.2%. Mexico and El Salvador were the most common places of birth for the 23.4% of the residents who were born abroad, considered to be a low percentage of foreign-born when compared with the city as a whole.

The median household income in 2008 dollars was $37,737, considered low for both the city and county. The percentage of households earning $20,000 or less was high, compared to the county at large. The average household size of three people was about average. Renters occupied 49.4% of the housing units, and homeowners occupied the rest.

The 2000 census counted 298 veterans, of whom 164 served in World War II or the Korean War, a percentage that was among the county's highest.

Education

Only 6% of Chesterfield Square residents 25 and older held a four-year degree, a low percentage for both the city and the county.

The schools that serve the boundaries of Chesterfield Square are:

 Testimonial Christian, (K-12, private), 5701 South Western Avenue
 Horace Mann Junior High School, (LAUSD), 7001 South Saint Andrews Place
 Marie Fegan Schools, Inc., (elementary, private), 2061 West Slauson Avenue
 Citizen Learning Academy, private, 6715 South Western Avenue
 Cleophas Oliver Learning Academy, private, 1902 West Florence Boulevard

Recreation and parks

 Chesterfield Square Park, 1950 West 54th Street
Facility Features: Children's Play Area, Picnic Tables 
 Van Ness Recreation Center, 5720 2nd Avenue  
Facility Features: Baseball Diamond (Lighted), Basketball Courts (Lighted / Outdoor), Children's Play Area, Football Field (Unlighted), Picnic Tables, Soccer Field (Unlighted), Tennis Courts (Lighted), Indoor Gym (without Weights), Outdoor Fitness Equipment.

Notable people
 Earl C. Gay (1902–75), Los Angeles City Council member, 1933–45

See also

References

External links
  Dash Minibus route of Los Angeles Department of Transportation
 Interactive map of Chesterfield Square
  Chesterfield Square crime map and statistics

Neighborhoods in Los Angeles
South Los Angeles